The 1989 Yukon general election was held on 20 February 1989 to elect members of the 27th Legislative Assembly of the territory of Yukon, Canada. It was won by the New Democratic Party.

Results by Party

|- style="background:#ccc;"
! rowspan="2" colspan="2" style="text-align:left;"|Party
! rowspan="2" style="text-align:left;"|Party leader
!rowspan="2"|Candidates
! colspan="4" style="text-align:center;"|Seats
!colspan="3" style="text-align:center;"|Popular vote
|- style="background:#ccc;"
| style="text-align:center;"|1985
| style="text-align:center;font-size: 80%;"|Dissol.
| style="text-align:center;"|1989
| style="text-align:center;"|Change
| style="text-align:center;"|#
| style="text-align:center;"|%
| style="text-align:center;"|Change

|align=left|Tony Penikett
|align="right"|16
|align="right"|8
|align="right"|9
|align="right"|9
|align="right"|+1
|align="right"|5,275
|align="right"|44.89%
|align="right"|+3.79%

|align=left|Willard Phelps
|align="right"|16
|align="right"|6
|align="right"|6
|align="right"|7
|align="right"|+1
|align="right"|5,172
|align="right"|44.02%
|align="right"|-2.89%

|align=left|Jim McLachlan
|align="right"|15
|align="right"|2
|align="right"|1
|align="right"|0
|align="right"|-2
|align="right"|1,303
|align="right"|11.09%
|align="right"|+3.45%
|-
| style="text-align:left;" colspan="3"|Total
| style="text-align:right;"|47
| style="text-align:right;"|16
| style="text-align:right;"|16
| style="text-align:right;"|16
| style="text-align:right;"|
| style="text-align:right;"|11,750
| style="text-align:right;"|100.00%
| style="text-align:right;"|
|}

Member Changes from Previous Election

Incumbents not Running for Reelection
The following MLAs had announced that they would not be running in the 1989 election:

New Democratic Party
Dave Porter (Watson Lake)
Roger Kimmerly (Whitehorse South Centre)

Results by Riding 
Bold indicates party leaders
† - denotes a retiring incumbent MLA

|-
| style="background:whitesmoke;"|Campbell
|
|Mickey Thomas120
|
|Carl Smarch78
||
|Sam Johnston321
||
|Sam Johnston
|-
| style="background:whitesmoke;"|Faro
|
|Mel Smith90
|
|Jim McLachlan168
||
|Maurice Byblow194
||
|Jim McLachlan
|-
| style="background:whitesmoke;"|Hootalinqua
||
|Willard Phelps541
|
|Rodger Thorlakson112
|
|Graham McDonald508
||
|Willard Phelps
|-
| style="background:whitesmoke;"|Klondike
|
|Peter Jenkins295
|
|
||
|Art Webster385
||
|Art Webster
|-
| style="background:whitesmoke;"|Kluane
||
|Bill Brewster210
|
|Bill Woolsey37
|
|Ron Chambers183
||
|Bill Brewster
|-
| style="background:whitesmoke;"|Mayo
|
|Mike McGinnis93
|
|Wilf Tuck34
||
|Piers McDonald210
||
|Piers McDonald
|-
| style="background:whitesmoke;"|Old Crow
|
|Kathie Nukon45
|
|Ethel Tizya40
||
|Norma Kassi69
||
|Norma Kassi
|-
| style="background:whitesmoke;"|Tatchun 
|
|Paul Nieman108
|
|Luke Lacasse71
||
|Danny Joe165
||
|Danny Joe
|-
| style="background:whitesmoke;"|Watson Lake
||
|John Devries298
|
|John McDonald63
|
|Karel Kauppinen295
||
|Dave Porter†
|-
| style="background:whitesmoke;"|Whitehorse North Centre
|
|Pat Joe155
|
|Don Branigan154
||
|Margaret Commodore251
||
|Margaret Commodore
|-
| style="background:whitesmoke;"|Whitehorse Porter Creek East
||
|Dan Lang606
|
|Patty O'Brien59
|
|Paul Harris292
||
|Dan Lang
|-
| style="background:whitesmoke;"|Whitehorse Porter Creek West
||
|Alan Nordling651
|
|Eldon Organ55
|
|John Wright392
||
|Alan Nordling
|-
| style="background:whitesmoke;"|Whitehorse Riverdale North
||
|Doug Phillips563
|
|Ray Jackson30
|
|Louis Paquet410
||
|Doug Phillips
|-
| style="background:whitesmoke;"|Whitehorse Riverdale South
||
|Bea Firth648
|
|Gray Jones79
|
|John Sheppard440
||
|Bea Firth
|-
| style="background:whitesmoke;"|Whitehorse South Centre
|
|Gerry Thick228
|
|Phil Wheelton163
||
|Joyce Hayden350
||
|Roger Kimmerly†
|-
| style="background:whitesmoke;"|Whitehorse West
|
|Flora Evans491
|
|Joe Jack160
||
|Tony Penikett810
||
|Tony Penikett
|}

References

Elections in Yukon
1989 elections in Canada
1989 in Yukon
February 1989 events in Canada